Granigyra inflata is a species of sea snail, a marine gastropod mollusk, unranked in the superfamily Seguenzioidea.

Description
The size of the shell varies between 1 mm and 1.5 mm.

Distribution
This species occurs in the Atlantic Ocean off Portugal.

References

 Jeffreys J. G., 1878–1885: On the mollusca procured during the H. M. S. "Lightning" and "Porcupine" expedition; Proceedings of the Zoological Society of London; Part 1 (1878): 393–416 pl. 22–23. Part 2 (1879): 553–588 pl. 45–46 [October 1879]. Part 3 (1881): 693–724 pl. 61. Part 4 (1881): 922–952 pl. 70–71 [1882]. Part 5 (1882): 656–687 pl. 49–50 [1883]. Part 6 (1883): 88–115 pl. 19–20. Part 7 (1884): 111–149 pl. 9–10. Part 8 (1884): 341–372 pl. 26–28. Part 9 (1885): 27–63 pl. 4–6

External links
 
 Warén A. (1992). New and little known "Skeneimorph" gastropods from the Mediterranean Sea and the adjacent Atlantic Ocean. Bollettino Malacologico 27(10–12): 149–248
 Warén A. (1996). New and little known mollusca from Iceland and Scandinavia. Part 3. Sarsia 81: 197–245
  Serge GOFAS, Ángel A. LUQUE, Joan Daniel OLIVER,José TEMPLADO & Alberto SERRA (2021) - The Mollusca of Galicia Bank (NE Atlantic Ocean); European Journal of Taxonomy 785: 1–114

inflata
Gastropods described in 1992